Jonathan Auxier (born August 10, 1981) is a Canadian-born writer of young adult literature.

Biography
Originally from Vancouver, British Columbia, Canada, he currently lives in Pittsburgh, Pennsylvania, US with his wife. He earned a BA from Trinity Western University in 2003 and a MFA in Dramatic Writing from Carnegie Mellon University in 2005. During graduate school, Auxier worked on a side project to refresh his creativity which he would eventually develop into the novel Peter Nimble; after graduating, he moved to Los Angeles to pursue a career in screenwriting.

Awards
Auxier won the TD Canadian Children's Literature Award and the Canadian Library Association Book of the Year for Children Award for his 2014 novel The Night Gardener. The book was also a shortlisted finalist for the Governor General's Award for English-language children's literature at the 2014 Governor General's Awards.

He won the Governor General's Award at the 2018 Governor General's Awards for Sweep: The Story of a Girl and Her Monster. Sweep also won the Children's/YA prize at the 2019 Vine Awards for Canadian Jewish Literature.

Bibliography
Standalone works
 
 

Peter Nimble series

References

External links

21st-century Canadian novelists
Canadian male novelists
Canadian expatriate writers in the United States
Writers from Vancouver
Writers from Pittsburgh
Living people
Canadian writers of young adult literature
21st-century Canadian male writers
Governor General's Award-winning children's writers
1981 births